Shambhu Nath Chaturvedi is an Indian politician and was the member of 6th Lok Sabha. He started his political career in 1952 when he was elected to Uttar Pradesh Legislative Assembly. In 1960 he was elected as First Mayor of  Agra Municipal Corporation .

References

1908 births
Year of death missing
India MPs 1977–1979
Janata Party politicians
Indian National Congress politicians
Indian National Congress (Organisation) politicians
Bharatiya Lok Dal politicians
India MPs 1998–1999
People from Agra
Lok Sabha members from Uttar Pradesh
Uttar Pradesh MLAs 1952–1957
Indian National Congress politicians from Uttar Pradesh